Cheggers Party Quiz is a quiz video game developed by Oxygen Games, featuring the TV personality Keith Chegwin as a host. The game was released for the PlayStation 2 and Microsoft Windows on 26 October 2007, and on the Nintendo Wii on 7 December 2007.

Gameplay 
Cheggers Party Quiz is a party quiz game where players compete against each other to answer questions correctly in a series of rounds. Keith Chegwin appears as the host in CGI form, giving updates on which players are in the lead and interjecting with one-liners. The game features a selection of thousands of questions for players to answer.

The players have the option of starting a short, medium or long game but cannot customise this to include specific round types. The questions are based on television shows, film and music from up to two decades before the game's release date. Round types include a slow reveal round where question marks slowly turn into letters or the "channel hopping" round where each player's answers are briefly revealed and everyone has a chance to change their answer. There are also a rounds where the fastest player to buzz in can answer and another where the answer must be guessed from picture clues. Altogether there are 8 round types known as "Opening Night", "Big Break", "Picture Show", "Star Turn", "Prime Time", "Typecast", "Channel Hopping" and "Final Cut".

Whereas the PlayStation 2 version uses the DualShock controller and an "L1" button press to buzz in, the Wii version utilises the motion sensitive Wii Remote, requiring players to lift their hand and the remote in the air as fast as they can.

Development 
During an interview, Keith Chegwin stated that he had recorded over 900 separate voice overs and that the process was more ad-libbed than strictly scripted.

Alan Hansen's Sports Challenge was developed concurrently with Cheggers Party Quiz and both games were released in tandem on the same dates.

Reception 
Jon Blyth at PC Zone rated the game 10/100, calling it a "bottom-feeding attempt to draw nourishment from the Chegwin name."

Ellie Gibson at Eurogamer gave the game a 6/10, saying that "you're better off investing in Buzz!".

References 

2007 video games
Europe-exclusive video games
Windows games
PlayStation 2 games
Quiz video games
Wii games
Multiplayer and single-player video games
Video games developed in the United Kingdom
Oxygen Games games